Versus Galliambicus (Latin), or the Galliambic Verse (English), is a verse built from the Ionic à minore dimeter catalectic verse, as it is a verse added upon an Ionic à minori dimeter base. The Galliambic verse consists of two iambic dimeters catalectic of which the last one lacks the final syllable. It is structured with four Ionic à minore feet that is varied by resolutio) or contraction. This metre is also meant for the goddess Cybele. In Latin, galliambus is a song of the priests of Cybele, the ancient nature goddess of Anatolia.

The Galliambic metre is constructed as shown below:

 uu | uu u uu u | – – || uu | uu u uu u | ×

 "x" represents an anceps
 a "u" represents a short syllable
 a "—" represents a long syllable
 a "uu" can be either 2 short syllables or 1 long syllable
 the "||" represents the caesura of the verse

Examples
The Galliambic Verse is found in Catullus 63:

 "()" represents a synaloepha

 u u  | -  u  -  u  | -  -  || u u  -  u u  u u|u
Sŭpĕr | āltă vēctŭs | Āttĭs || cĕlĕrī rătĕ mărĭ|ă 
 u   u    | -  u  -   u| - - || u u | -  u u  u u |u
Phrygĭ(um)| ūt nĕmŭs cĭ|tātō || cŭpĭ|dē pĕdĕ tĕtĭg|ĭt 
- Catullus 63, lines 1-2

Variations
As the Galliambic meter admits substitutions of two short syllables for a long one, there are variations on how this verse is structured on different sentences.

this is one type of variation of the Galliambic verse
 u u | - u  u u  u |-  - ||  u u|-   u u  | u u |-
stĭmŭ|lātŭs ĭbĭ fŭr|entī || răbĭ|ē, văgŭs | ănĭm|ī,
-Catullus 63, Line 4

this is another type variation of the Galliambic verse
u u | u u u   u     u u |-  -   || u     u|  - u   u u  u|u
Ĕgŏ | mŭlĭĕr, ĕg(o) ădŏl|ēscēns,|| ĕg(o) ĕ|phēbŭs, ĕgŏ pŭ|ĕr 
- Catullus 63, Line 63

this is another type of variation of the Galliambic verse
u u |  u u u  - u      - - ||  u     u -  u  u u  u| u
ĕgŏ | vĭrĭdĭs ălgĭ(da) Īdǣ || nĕv(e) ămĭctă lŏcă cŏ|lăm.
- Catullus 63, Line 70

Modern use

Alfred, Lord Tennyson used the Galliambic metre for his poem, Boadicea.

Although Catullus 63 is not typically translated directly into Galliambics, as they present more of a challenge in English, Peter Green did so for his 2005 edition of the complete poems of Catullus.

References

Types of verses